The following is a comparison of high-definition smartphone displays, containing information about their specific screen technology, resolution, size and pixel density. It is divided into three categories, containing smartphones with 720p, 1080p and 1440p displays.

The "p-display" nomenclature used in this article refers to the number of pixels displayed across the width of a given phone's screen.  Earlier phones with lower than 720p (lower than HD ready resolution) are not included in this listing.  The lists below are dynamic lists and may be sorted into alphabetical order by clicking on the "sort icons" at the top of the first column.

Display resolutions

Full list 

 Pixel aspect ratio (PAR) The horizontal to vertical ratio of each, rectangular, physical pixel
 Storage aspect ratio (SAR) The horizontal to vertical ratio of solely the number of pixels in each direction.
 Display aspect ratio (DAR) The combination (which occurs by multiplication) of both the pixel aspect ratio and storage aspect ratio giving the aspect ratio as experienced by the viewer.

Lite list

720p by 1280 (HD ready)

736-828 nonstandard

1080p

1125-1344 nonstandard

1440p

1600 by 3840 (4K UW QHD)

2160p by 3840 (4K UHD)

Display misc and others

Refresh rate and touch-sensing rate

Screen-to-body-ratio

See also 

Comparison of smartphones
List of mobile phones with WVGA (Wide Video Graphics Array) display, eg 768 x 480
List of mobile phones with FWVGA (Full Wide VGA) display (854 x 480)
Display resolution

List of common resolutions
Graphics display resolution

HD video
Ultra-high-definition television: Ultra HD
Computer display standard
Display aspect ratio
Widescreen (eg 16:9, 16:10)
Ultrawide formats (eg 21:9, 20.5:9)
Aspect ratio (disambiguation)
List of mobile phone brands by country
Smartphone patent wars
Mobile device: Portable device

Notes

References 

High-definition smartphone displays
Display devices
High-definition smartphone displays